Sean Bowie is an American politician and a former Democratic member of the Arizona State Senate elected to represent District 18 in 2016. Bowie previously worked as a Senior Planning Analyst for the Provost's office  at Arizona State University and now serves as a Professor of Practice at the ASU College of Public Service & Community Solutions. On September 8, 2021, Bowie announced that he would not seek re-election to the Arizona Senate in 2022.

Education
Bowie received a bachelor's degree in Political Science and History from Arizona State University and a master's degree in public policy from Carnegie Mellon University.

Elections
 2016 Bowie ran unopposed in the Democratic Primary. He defeated Republican Frank Schmuck, who defeated incumbent Jeff Dial in the republican primary, in the general election.

References

External links
 Official page at the Arizona State Legislature
 Biography at Ballotpedia
 Biography at Vote Smart

Living people
Year of birth missing (living people)
Arizona State University alumni
Carnegie Mellon University alumni
Democratic Party Arizona state senators
21st-century American politicians